Patrick Joseph "Pat" Descrimes (31 December 1877 – 6 January 1939) was an Australian rules footballer who played for the Fitzroy Football Club in the Victorian Football League (VFL).

Descrimes debuted at Fitzroy in opening game of the inaugural VFL season in 1897 and went on to play four seasons for the club. He was a follower in Fitzroy's 1898 premiership team and a half forward flanker in their premiership side in 1899.

References

External links

1877 births
Australian rules footballers from Victoria (Australia)
Fitzroy Football Club players
Fitzroy Football Club Premiership players
1939 deaths
Two-time VFL/AFL Premiership players